Eisbein (literally: 'ice bone') is a German culinary dish of corned ham hock, usually cured and slightly boiled. The name originates from the practice of using the pig's leg bone for ice skating. In Southern parts of Germany, the common preparation is known as Schweinshaxe, and it is usually roasted.

Eisbein is usually sold already cured and sometimes smoked, and then used in simple hearty dishes. Numerous regional variations exist, for example in Berlin it is served with pease pudding. In Franconia, Eisbein is commonly served with mashed potatoes or sauerkraut, in Austria with horseradish and mustard instead.

See also

  – also includes ham hock dishes

References
Notes

External links

German cuisine
Czech cuisine
Polish cuisine
Pomeranian cuisine
Pork dishes
Pickles
Salted foods
Smoked meat